All Saints is a Church of England parish church in Sheffield, England.  It is a Grade II listed building, and is located in Ecclesall, between Ringinglow Road and Ecclesall Road South.
All Saints' emergent youth and young adults congregation is called "The Uncut Project".

History
In the thirteenth century Ralph de Ecclesall gave his mill on the River Sheaf to the monks of Beauchief Abbey. Out of the proceeds of the mill the monks were to provide a canon to officiate at daily services in his chapel. These services continued until the Dissolution of the Monasteries in the sixteenth century. In 1622 the chapel was restored and brought back into use as a chapel of ease to the parish of Sheffield. In the 1780s a new chapel was constructed a short distance from the old one, this opened on 13 December 1788 and the old chapel was demolished. This building was improved in 1843 and enlarged in 1864. The parish of Sheffield was sub-divided in 1845 and Ecclesall chapel became the mother church of the parish of Ecclesall. A new transept was added in 1907, and the church was reordered in 1964 by George Pace, and again in 1997.

List of Vicars
1849–1853 Rev William Humphrey Vale
1853–1856 Rev Henry Farish
1856–1880 Rev Edward Newman
1880–1898 Rev George Sandford
1899–1927 Rev Canon Thomas Houghton
1928–1938 Rev Canon Herbert William Mackay
1939–1960 Rev Canon George Jefferis Jordan
1960–1967 Rev Richard Hanson
1968–1990 Rev Canon John Norman Collie
1991–2006 Rev Canon Dr Peter Williams
2007–2012 Rev Canon Simon Bessant
2012–2013 Rev Stephen Hunter (Acting)
2013–2019 Rev Canon Dr Gary Wilton
2021-Present Rev Canon Mark Brown

See also

List of works by George Pace

References

External links

All Saints Church website
The Uncut Project

Churches completed in 1788
18th-century Church of England church buildings
Churches in Sheffield
Church of England church buildings in South Yorkshire
Grade II listed churches in South Yorkshire
Grade II listed buildings in Sheffield
1788 establishments in England